Suneeta Rao is an Indian pop singer, playback singer, dancer and stage actress, popular for her songs sung in the 1980s and 1990s. Her most famous song is Paree Hoon Main from the album Dhuan (1991).

Early life and career
Rao was born in Germany. She completed her schooling in Mumbai and higher studies at St. Xavier's College, Mumbai.  During and after college, she acted in many plays such as Evita and musicals such as They're Playing Our Song and Greased Lightning.

Singing and stage career

Rao started her career with the song Suneeta Senorita in 1989. She became popular with the song "Paree Hoon main".

She released a Hindi pop album entitled Dhuan in 1991 with HMV, which sold over 75,000 copies, with music by Lesle Lewis. The song and video of "Paree" from the album made Suneeta Rao a household name, leading the press to affectionately crown her the "Paree of the  Masses".

Her first and only association with A. R. Rahman was "Adi Paru Mangatha", from the 1994 Tamil film May Madham. She released a Hindi pop album entitled Talaash in 1999 with HMV, with music by Ranjit Barot.

Two videos that hit the screen were for the songs "Dehka Dehka" and "Kesariya", two folksy upbeat tracks  that reinstated Rao at the top of the charts. She then released a new single and music video entitled "Chhoti Chhoti Baatein" as part of the Magnasound album A Reason To Smile on the occasion of 50 years of Indian Independence. She also featured in a group song in the album called "Wajah Muskurane Ki".

Besides going platinum, all the above albums were at the top of the Hindi music charts.  Her album Ab Ke Baras has lilting, sensuous, joyous music that blends traditional folk music with modern production values.

Her career includes songs from films like Ghulam-e-Mustafa, Dulhan Hum le Jayenge and Kahin pyar na ho jaye. Suneeta Rao also has shows in Pakistan and Africa in the offing, as well as several other projects for television, theatre and films.

She performed for NDTV in 2008.

Rao wrote and recorded an anthem song for global warming. This was for a campaign initiated by the ICAI and GYAAN called "Planet alert". The song launched the campaign in a radiothon that was aired from 5 June 2009 on BIG 92.7 FM!  The song was produced by Dhruv Ghanekar, and sung by Rao.

Rao launched her new album Waqt on 15 July 2008 at the Hard Rock Cafe. These Raag-based contemporary songs were composed by Rao, with music arranged by Nexus, DJ Gaurav Issar and Dudul Saikia. The CDs were available in stores under the Crescendo Music label.  The first video was of the song "Sun Zara", a song for the Girl Child, supported by the UNFPA, to address the issue of sex-selection. The video was directed by Rachel Reuben, shot by Jason West, and stars Suneeta Rao and leading actress Suchitra Pillai.

Suneeta Rao gave 12 performances in the NDTV Imagine reality show Dhoom Macha De and received the runner up award for the "Dhoom final stopper". In 2005, she acted in an Off-Broadway play in New York called Sidd.

Personal life
Rao is married to Jason West, a cinematographer based in Mumbai.  She is actively involved and is the spokesperson of an initiative called Laadli, organized by an NGO called Population First, started by her uncle, Bobby Sista, whose main agenda is "Saving the Girl Child", population control and other social movements in India.

Discography
 Senorita (1989)
 Dhuan (1991)
 Ekk Pal Hai Zindagi (1995) (Title Song Of TV Serial "Swabhimaan")
 Talaash (1996)
 Choti Choti Batein - Single (1997)
 Ab Ke Baras (2000)
 Mujhe Pyar Ho Gaya - Single (2001)
 Waqt (2008)
 Vaada Karo - Single (2018)  
 Dekha Tujhe To Dil Remake (2020)

References

External links
 Official site

21st-century Indian singers
21st-century Indian women singers
Bollywood playback singers
Indian women playback singers
Indian women pop singers
Indian stage actresses
Living people
Singers from Mumbai
St. Xavier's College, Mumbai alumni
Women musicians from Maharashtra
Year of birth missing (living people)